The Women's 48 kg weightlifting event was the lightest women's event at the competition, limiting competitors to a maximum of 48 kilograms of body mass. The competition took place on 24 July at 15:00 and was the first Weightlifting event to conclude. The event took place at the Clyde Auditorium.

Result

References

Weightlifting at the 2014 Commonwealth Games
Common